Víllora is a municipality located in the province of Cuenca, Castile-La Mancha, Spain. According to the 2018 census (INE), the municipality has a population of 227 inhabitants.

References

Municipalities in the Province of Cuenca